Armen Rustamyan (born March 1, 1960) is an Armenian politician from the Armenian Revolutionary Federation. He is a deputy in the National Assembly of Armenia, first elected in 1999.

References

External links
Armen Rustamyan - Armenia Alliance

1960 births
Armenian Revolutionary Federation politicians
Living people
Members of the National Assembly (Armenia)